Zeberkhan may refer to:
 Zeberkhan District
 Zeberkhan Rural District